KVBT may refer to:

 KVBT-LD, a low-power television station (channel 26, virtual 13) licensed to Santa Clara, etc., Utah, United States
 Bentonville Municipal Airport in Bentonville, Arkansas (ICAO code KVBT)